This page lists articles about writers of original, licensed fiction associated with the long-running British science fiction television series Doctor Who. This does not include writers of only short stories or novelisations of the television stories.

B
 Trevor Baxendale
 Christopher H. Bidmead
 Jonathan Blum
 Daniel Blythe
 Chris Boucher
 Colin Brake
 Simon Bucher-Jones
 Christopher Bulis

C
 Andrew Cartmel
 Mark Clapham
 Stephen Cole
 J. T. Colgan
 Paul Cornell

D
 Peter Darvill-Evans
 Russell T Davies
 Martin Day
 Terrance Dicks
 Richard Dinnick

F
 Simon A. Forward

G
 Mark Gatiss
 Simon Guerrier

H
 Mags L Halliday
 Craig Hinton
 Robert Holmes

J
 Matt Jones

L
 Andy Lane
 Paul Leonard
 Barry Letts
 Rebecca Levene
 Steve Lyons

M
 Paul Magrs
 Stephen Marley
 Ian Marter
 Simon Messingham
 Mark Michalowski
 Lawrence Miles
 Jon de Burgh Miller
 Michael Moorcock
 Jonathan Morris
 Mark Morris
 Jim Mortimore
 Steven Moffat

O
 Daniel O'Mahony
 Kate Orman

P
 Lance Parkin
 James Parsons
 John Peel
 Robert Perry
 Marc Platt

R
 Jacqueline Rayner
 Alastair Reynolds
 Justin Richards
 Gareth Roberts
 Nigel Robinson
 Gary Russell

S
 Dale Smith
 Dave Stone
 Eric Saward

T
 Keith Topping
 Mike Tucker

W
 Nick Wallace
 Simon Winstone

Novelists